Events from the year 1983 in the United Kingdom.

Incumbents
 Monarch – Elizabeth II
 Prime Minister – Margaret Thatcher (Conservative)
 Parliament
 48th (until 13 May)
 49th (starting 15 June)

Events

January
 1 January – The British Nationality Act 1981 comes into effect creating five classes of British nationality.
 3 January – Children's ITV is launched as a new branding for the late afternoon programming block on the ITV network.
 5 January – Two policemen and a policewoman drown at Blackpool after going into the sea to rescue a man who entered the sea to save his dog (both of whom also drown).
 6 January – Danish fishermen defy the British government's prohibition on non-UK boats fishing in its coastal waters.
 14 January – Shooting of Stephen Waldorf: Armed policemen shoot and severely injure an innocent car passenger in London, believing him to be escaped prisoner David Martin.
 17 January – The first British breakfast television programme, Breakfast Time, is launched on BBC One at 6:30AM. 
 19 January – The two policemen who wounded Stephen Waldorf are charged with attempted murder and released on bail; they are suspended from duty pending further investigation.
 23 January – The prohibition on non-British boats fishing in British waters is lifted as the European Economic Community's Common Fisheries Policy comes into effect.
 25 January – The Infrared Astronomical Satellite, the first-ever space-based observatory to perform a survey of the entire sky at infrared wavelengths, is launched. The satellite is a joint project between the American space agency NASA, the Netherlands Agency for Aerospace Programmes and the UK's Science and Engineering Research Council.
 26 January – Red rain falls in the UK, caused by sand from the Sahara Desert in the droplets.
 28 January – Escaped prisoner David Martin (for whom Stephen Waldorf was mistaken) is rearrested.
 31 January – Seatbelt use for drivers and front seat passengers becomes mandatory, 11 years after becoming compulsory equipment in new cars.

February
 February – Work begins on extending the Piccadilly line of London Underground at Heathrow Airport to serve the new Terminal 4.
 1 February – TV-am launches on ITV.
 3 February – Unemployment stands at a record high of 3,224,715 – though the previous high reached in the Great Depression of the early 1930s accounted for a higher percentage of the workforce.
 10 February – Dismembered sets of human remains are found at a block of flats in Muswell Hill, North London. 37-year-old civil servant Dennis Nilsen is arrested on suspicion of murder.
 11 February – Dennis Nilsen is charged with the murder of 20-year-old Stephen Sinclair, who was last seen alive in January. Police are working to identify the other sets of human remains found at Nilsen's flat, in order to press further murder charges against Nilsen; his trial will open in October.
 15 February – The Austin Metro is now Britain's best selling car, having outsold every other new car registered in the UK during January. 
 24 February – Bermondsey by-election: Simon Hughes (Liberal) defeats Peter Tatchell (Labour) with the largest by-election swing in British political history (44.2%) following a campaign characterised by homophobia. The Official Monster Raving Loony Party first contests an election under this label.
 26 February – Pat Jennings, 37-year-old Arsenal and Northern Ireland goalkeeper, becomes the first player in the English game to appear in 1,000 senior football matches.

March
 March – The compact disc (CD) goes on sale in the United Kingdom.
 1 March – British Leyland launches the Austin Maestro, a five-door family hatchback with front-wheel drive which replaces the recently discontinued Maxi and Allegro. The Maestro also forms the basis of a new range of saloons and estates which are set to go into production early next year.
 15 March – The Budget raises tax allowances, and cuts taxes by £2 billion.
 26 March – Liverpool win the Football League Cup for the third year in succession, beating Manchester United 2–1 in the final at Wembley Stadium. The Reds, whose manager Bob Paisley will retire at the end of the current football season, are also on course to win the Football League First Division title for a record 14th time.
 28 March – Ian MacGregor appointed as chairman of the National Coal Board, taking office on 1 September.

April
 April – Vauxhall launches the Nova supermini with a range of three-door hatchbacks and two-door saloons. It is the first Vauxhall to be built outside the United Kingdom, being assembled at the Zaragoza plant in Spain where it was launched seven months ago as the Opel Corsa, but plans to launch it on the British market had been attacked by trade unions who were angry at the fact that it would not be built in Britain. Its launch is expected to result in the end of Vauxhall Chevette production in Britain.
 1 April
 Thousands of protesters form a 14-mile human chain in reaction to the siting of American nuclear weapons in British military bases.
 The government expels three Russians named as KGB agents by a Soviet defector.
 4 April – The biggest cash haul in British history sees gunmen escape with £7 million from a Security Express van in East London.
 11 April – Richard Attenborough's 1982 film Gandhi wins eight Academy Awards.
 21 April – The one pound coin introduced in England and Wales.

May
 9 May – Margaret Thatcher calls a general election for 9 June. Opinion polls show her on course for victory with the Tories 8–12 points ahead of Labour, and they are widely expected to form a significant overall majority due to the split in left-wing votes caused by the Alliance, who are now aiming to take Labour's place in opposition.
14 May – Dundee United F.C. are crowned Scottish football champions for the first time in their history by winning the Scottish Premier Division, on the final day of the league season at the home of their city rivals Dundee F.C., Dens Park.
 16 May – Wheel clamps are first used to combat illegal parking in London.
 21 May – Manchester United and Brighton & Hove Albion draw 2–2 in the FA Cup final at Wembley Stadium. The replay will be held in five days time.
 26 May
 Manchester United defeat Brighton & Hove Albion 4–0 in the FA Cup final replay at Wembley Stadium. Bryan Robson scores two of the goals, with the other two coming from Arnold Muhren and 18-year-old Norman Whiteside.
 Opinion polls suggest that the Conservatives are looking set to be re-elected with a landslide. A MORI poll puts them on 51%, 22 points ahead of Labour.

June
 1 June – Jockey Lester Piggott rides Teenoso to victory at the Epsom Derby, Piggott's ninth win in the race.
 6 June – The thirteenth James Bond film – Octopussy – is released in UK cinemas. It is the sixth of seven films to star Roger Moore as James Bond.
 9 June – 1983 UK general election: Margaret Thatcher, Conservative Prime Minister of the United Kingdom since 1979, wins a landslide victory with a majority of 144 seats (through just 42% of the popular vote) over Michael Foot, who led a highly divided and weakened Labour Party which earned only 28% of the vote. Among the new members of parliament are three Labour MP's who will be future party leaders, Tony Blair for Sedgefield in County Durham, Gordon Brown for Dunfermline East in Scotland and Jeremy Corbyn for Islington North in London. The election is also a disappointment for the SDP–Liberal Alliance, who come close behind Labour in votes but are left with a mere 23 MPs in the new parliament compared to Labour's 209. The new 650-seat parliament will have 397 Conservative MP's, whereas Labour now has just 209. The election also sees the retirement of former prime minister Harold Wilson after 38 years as a Labour MP.
 10 June – Computer tycoon Clive Sinclair is knighted.
 12 June – Michael Foot resigns as leader of the Labour Party. Neil Kinnock, shadow spokesman for education and MP for Islwyn in South Wales, is tipped to succeed him; however, the successor will not be confirmed until this autumn.
 14 June – Roy Jenkins resigns as leader of the Social Democratic Party and is succeeded by David Owen. Although the SDP gained 25% (around 7 million) of the votes and fell just short of Labour in terms of votes, they attained only a fraction of the number of seats won by Labour.
 15 June – The first episode of the historical sitcom Blackadder, is broadcast on BBC One. 
 16 June – National Museum of Photography, Film and Television opens in Bradford.

July
 7 July – New chancellor Nigel Lawson announces public spending cuts of £500 million.
 13 July
 Neil Kinnock escapes uninjured when his Ford Sierra overturns on the M4 motorway in Berkshire.
 MP's vote 361–245 against the reinstatement of the death penalty, 18 years after its abolition.
 15 July – Much of the country embraces a heatwave as temperatures reach 33 °C in London.
 16 July – Twenty people are killed in the 1983 British Airways Sikorsky S-61 crash in the Celtic Sea. 
 19 July – A large new model of a flesh-eating dinosaur is erected at the Natural History Museum.
 21 July – Former prime minister Harold Wilson is one of 17 life peerages announced today, having stood down from parliament last month after 38 years as MP for Huyton, near Liverpool.
 22 July – Production of the Ford Orion four-door saloon begins. The Orion is the saloon version of the Escort, but is also aimed at buyers of larger family saloon cars like the recently discontinued Cortina. It goes on sale this Autumn and is produced at the Halewood plant in Liverpool as well as the Valencia plant in Spain which also produces the smaller Fiesta.
 26 July – A Catholic mother of ten, Victoria Gillick, loses a case in the High Court of Justice against the DHSS. Her application sought to prevent the distribution of contraceptives to children under the age of 16 without parental consent. The case goes to the House of Lords in 1985 when it is decided that it is legal for doctors to prescribe contraceptives to under-16s without parental consent in exceptional circumstances ("Gillick competence").
 1 to 31 July – The two hundredth anniversary of the previous hottest month in the CET series sees a new record for heat with a monthly mean CET of  –  hotter than July 1783.

August
 1 August – The new A-prefix car registration plates are launched, helping spur on the recovery in car sales following the slump at the start of the decade caused by the recession. 
 5 August – 22 Provisional Irish Republican Army (IRA) members receive sentences totalling over 4,000 years from a Belfast Court.
 19 August – Temperatures reach 30 °C in London, as hot weather embraces the United Kingdom.
 29 August – ITV launches Blockbusters, a gameshow hosted by Bob Holness and featuring sixth formers as its contestants.

September
 8 September – The National Health Service privatises cleaning, catering and laundering services in a move which Social Services Secretary Norman Fowler predicts will save between £90 million and £180 million a year.
 11 September – The SDP Conference voted against a merger with the Liberals until at least 1988.
 19 September – The West Indian island nation of Saint Kitts and Nevis becomes independent of the United Kingdom.
 21 September – The England national football team lose 1–0 to Denmark at Wembley Stadium in the penultimate qualifying game for Euro 84, making qualification unlikely.
 22 September – Docklands redevelopment in East London begins with the opening of an Enterprise Zone on the Isle of Dogs.
 25 September – Maze Prison escape: 38 IRA prisoners armed with six guns hijack a lorry and escape from HM Prison Maze in County Antrim, Northern Ireland; one guard dies of a heart attack and 20 others are injured in the attempt to foil the escape, the largest prison escape since World War II and in British history. 19 escapees are later apprehended.
 30 September – In the latest crackdown on football hooliganism, seven men (all members of the notorious Subway Army, a football firm associated with Wolverhampton Wanderers F.C.) are convicted of taking part in a fight near the club's stadium.
 September – Ford launches two new models, the second generation Fiesta supermini and the Orion, the saloon version of the big-selling Escort.

October
 2 October – Neil Kinnock is elected leader of the Labour Party following the retirement of Michael Foot. Kinnock attracted more than 70% of the votes, and names Roy Hattersley (who came second with nearly 20%) as his deputy.
 4 October – Richard Noble, driving the British turbojet-powered car Thrust2, takes the land speed record to 634.051 mph (1020.406 km/h) over 1 km (633.47 mph (1019.47 km/h) over 1 mile) at Black Rock Desert in the United States, an increase of 40 mph over the previous kilometre record.
 7 October – A plan to abolish the Greater London Council is announced.
 14 October – Cecil Parkinson resigns as Trade and Industry Secretary following revelations about his extramarital relationship with his secretary Sara Keays.
 19 October – Shooting of Stephen Waldorf: The two Metropolitan policemen who mistakenly shot and wounded Stephen Waldorf in January are cleared of attempted murder.
 22 October – Between 200,000 and a million people demonstrate against nuclear weapons at a Campaign for Nuclear Disarmament march in London.
 24 October
 Arthur Hutchinson kills three members of the Laitner family and rapes their daughter in the Sheffield suburb of Dore.
 Dennis Nilsen goes on trial at the Central Criminal Court accused of six murders and two attempted murders. He confesses to murdering "15 or 16" men.
 25 October
 American forces invade the Commonwealth country of Grenada.
 Roy Griffiths presents his report on general management of the National Health Service.

November
 4 November – Dennis Nilsen is sentenced to life imprisonment.
 5 November – Five workers on the Byford Dolphin semi-submersible oil rig are killed in an explosive decompression while drilling in the Frigg gas field in the Norwegian sector of the North Sea.
 13 November
 The first United States cruise missiles arrive at RAF Greenham Common in Berkshire amid protests from peace campaigners at the Greenham Common Women's Peace Camp.
 Gerry Adams takes office as elected leader of Sinn Féin.
 16 November – England beat Luxembourg 4–0 in their final Euro 84 qualifying game but still fail to qualify for next summer's tournament in France as Denmark also win their final qualifying game. After the game, more than 20 England fans are arrested after going on a violent rampage in Luxembourg.
 18 November – Walton sextuplets: 31-year-old Liverpool woman Janet Walton gives birth to female sextuplets following fertility treatment, the world's first all-female surviving sextuplets.
 23 November – The 23-mile M54 motorway opens, giving the M6 north of Wolverhampton a link with the new town of Telford in Shropshire.
 24 November – Fifteen-year-old Lynda Mann is found raped and strangled in the village of Narborough, Leicestershire, for which Colin Pitchfork will eventually be convicted.
 26 November – Brink's-Mat robbery: In London, 6,800 gold bars worth nearly £26 million are taken from the Brink's-Mat vault at Heathrow Airport. Only a fraction of the gold is ever recovered, and only two men are convicted of the crime.

December
 4 December – An SAS undercover operation ends in the shooting and killing of two IRA gunmen, a third is injured.
 6 December – First heart and lung transplant carried out in Britain at Harefield Hospital.
 8 December – The House of Lords votes to allow television broadcast of its proceedings.
 10 December – William Golding wins the Nobel Prize in Literature "for his novels which, with the perspicuity of realistic narrative art and the diversity and universality of myth, illuminate the human condition in the world of today".
 15 December – The second of two James Bond films not produced by Eon Productions – Never Say Never Again – is released in UK cinemas. An adaptation of the novel Thunderball (which had previously been adapted by Eon in the 1965 film of the same name), it marks Sean Connery's return as James Bond for his seventh and final overall outing.
 17 December – Six people are killed in the Harrods bombing.
 25 December (Christmas Day) – A second IRA bomb explodes in Oxford Street, but this time nobody is injured.

Undated
 Designer and entrepreneur James Dyson produces his prototype vacuum cleaner.
 Hanson Trust takes over United Drapery Stores (UDS) to realise the assets of its high street shops.
 Thames Water shuts down the reciprocating stationary steam engines at its Waddon pumping station in Croydon, the last in Britain to pump drinking water by steam. 
 Despite unemployment remaining in excess of 3 million, the battle against inflation which has largely contributed to mass unemployment is being won as inflation falls to 4.6% – the lowest level since 1966.
 The economic recovery continues with 4.7% overall growth for the year, the highest since 1973. The year also sees unbroken growth for the first time since 1978.
 Japanese carmaker Nissan, which plans to open a factory in Britain by 1986, drops the Datsun marque on British registered cars after nearly two decades and adopts the Nissan brand in its place.

Publications
 Barbara Cartland writes 23 romantic novels.
 Andrew Hodges' biography Alan Turing: The Enigma.
 Howard Jacobson's first novel Coming from Behind.
 Terry Pratchett's first Discworld novel The Colour of Magic.
 Salman Rushdie's novel Shame.
 Graham Swift's novel Waterland.
 Saga Magazine begins publication; it will become Britain's biggest selling subscription monthly.

Births
 1 January – Calum Davenport, footballer
 17 January – Christopher Stalford, Northern Irish politician (died 2022)
 21 January – Wes Streeting, politician
 24 January – Shaun Maloney, Scottish football player and manager
 27 January – Douglas Ross, Scottish politician
 31 January – James Sutton, actor
 16 February – Agyness Deyn, model and actress
 18 February 
 Louise Glover, model and photographer
 Jermaine Jenas, television presenter and footballer
 22 February – Dominic Lyne, author  
 23 February – Emily Blunt, actress
 24 February – Sophie Howard, glamour model 
 26 February – Andrew Baggaley, English table tennis player 
 27 February – Hayley Angel Holt, actress  
 28 February – Terry Bywater, basketball player 
 4 March – Adam Deacon, actor 
 9 March – Bryony Afferson, actress and musician  
 12 March – Roxy Shahidi, actress  
 14 March 
 Joe Flynn, actor
 Anas Sarwar, politician
 15 March – Sean Biggerstaff, actor
 21 March – Bruno Langley, actor
 28 March – Ryan Ashington, footballer
 29 March – Ed Skrein, actor and rapper
 31 March – Meinir Gwilym, Welsh folk singer  
 13 April – Marvin Morgan, footballer (died 2021)
 14 April – Simon Burnett, swimmer
 5 May – Henry Cavill, actor
 6 May – Magdalen Berns, YouTuber, boxer and software developer (d. 2019)
 8 May – Matt Willis, singer-songwriter 
 13 May – Natalie Cassidy, actress
 18 May – Lyndon Ogbourne, actor
 19 May – Jessica Fox, actress
 20 May – Emma Williams, actress 
 22 May – Connie and Cassie Powney, twin actresses  
 26 May – Henry Holland, fashion designer
 28 May – Toby Hemingway, British/American actor
 30 May – Jennifer Ellison, actress
 31 May – Reggie Yates, actor, television presenter, and radio DJ  
 2 June – Lisa Hammond, actress  
 6 June – Gemma Bissix, actress
 8 June – Allan Dick, Scottish field hockey goalkeeper
 17 June 
 Connie Fisher, actress and singer
 Lee Ryan, singer
 19 June 
 Laura Norton, actress
 Mark Selby, snooker player
 22 June – Sally Nicholls, children's author 
 24 June – Christian Day, English rugby union player 
 25 June – Todd Cooper, swimmer
 30 June – Cheryl Cole, singer
 6 July – David Price, boxer
 19 July – Helen Skelton, TV presenter
 20 July – Rory Jennings, actor
 22 July – Jodi Albert, actress and singer  
 5 August - Kara Tointon, actress
 6 August – Neil Harvey, English-Barbadian footballer
 7 August - Tina O'Brien, actress
 9 August – David Ames, actor
 11 August – Sammy Glenn, actress 
 21 August – Chantelle Houghton, reality TV star
 22 August – Julie Kilpatrick, Scottish field hockey player
 23 August – Fiona Onasanya, Labour Member of Parliament and criminal convicted of perverting the course of justice
 24 August – Christopher Parker, actor
 1 September - Mohammed Marban, Model
 4 September – Jennifer Metcalfe, actress  
 13 September – James Bourne, singer-songwriter  
 14 September – Amy Winehouse, singer-songwriter (died 2011)
 17 September – Catherine Tyldesley, English actress and model  
 18 September – Naomi Folkard, archer
 30 September – Louise Munn, Scottish field hockey defender
 1 October – Tom Dillon, English rugby union player
 14 October
 David Oakes, film, television and theatre actor
 Zesh Rehman, English-Pakistani footballer
 17 October – Felicity Jones, actress
 28 October – Joe Thomas, actor
 10 November – Jo Ellis, English field hockey forward
 15 November – Sophia Di Martino, actress
 17 November – Harry Lloyd, actor
 18 November – Robert Kazinsky, actor and model
 24 November 
 Dean Ashton, footballer
 Gwilym Lee, Welsh actor
 28 November
 Ellie Taylor, English comedian and television presenter
 Kelly Wenham, English actress 
 6 December – Francesca Jackson, musical theatre actress
 19 December – Bridget Phillipson, politician 
 20 December – Lucy Pinder, model
date unknown
Leila Benn Harris, actress and singer

Deaths
 2 January – Dick Emery, comedian and actor (born 1915)
 22 January – Walter Citrine, 1st Baron Citrine, trade unionist (born 1887)
 23 January – Fred Bakewell, cricketer (born 1908)
 28 January – Billy Fury, rock singer-songwriter (born 1940)
 13 February – Edward Fletcher, Labour Member of Parliament (born 1911)
 22 February – Sir Adrian Boult, conductor (born 1889)
 8 March – Sir William Walton, composer (born 1902)
 15 March – Dame Rebecca West, writer (born 1892)
 16 March – Freda Dudley Ward, socialite (born 1894)
 3 April – Jimmy Bloomfield, footballer and manager (born 1934)
 13 April – Gerry Hitchens, footballer (born 1934)
 17 April – Thomas L. Thomas, singer (born 1911)
 21 May – Kenneth Clark, Baron Clark, art historian (born 1903)
 1 June – Sir Thomas Pike, Royal Air Force Commander (born 1906)
 5 June –  Sir Anthony Lewis, musicologist (born 1915)
 4 July – John Bodkin Adams, physician, suspected serial killer (born 1899)
 29 July – David Niven, film actor (born 1910)
 1 August – Peter Arne, actor (born 1924)
 5 August – Joan Robinson, economist (born 1903)
 14 August – Ian Nairn, architectural critic (born 1930)
 18 August – Sir Nikolaus Pevsner, German-born architectural historian (The Buildings of England) (born 1902)
 15 September  – Beverley Nichols, author (born 1898)
 20 September – Andy Beattie, Scottish footballer and manager (born 1913)
 10 October – Ralph Richardson, actor (born 1902)
 15 November – John Le Mesurier, actor (born 1912)
 22 November – Grahame Farr, maritime historian (born 1912)
 25 November – Anton Dolin, dancer and choreographer (born 1904)
 30 November – Richard Llewellyn, novelist (born 1906)
 11 December
 Norah, Lady Docker, socialite (born 1906)
 Sir Neil Ritchie, general (born 1897)
 13 December – Mary Renault, novelist (born 1905)
 23 December – Colin Middleton, artist (born 1910)
 26 December – Violet Carson, actress (born 1898)

See also
 List of British films of 1983

References

 
Years of the 20th century in the United Kingdom
United Kingdom